Cizkrajov is a municipality and village in Jindřichův Hradec District in the South Bohemian Region of the Czech Republic. It has about 500 inhabitants.

Administrative parts
Villages of Dolní Bolíkov, Holešice and Mutná are administrative parts of Cizkrajov.

History
The first written mention of Cizkrajov is from 1301. The village was founded at the turn of the 12th and 13th centuries.

References

External links

 

Villages in Jindřichův Hradec District